Time Changes is a 1964 album by The Dave Brubeck Quartet, based upon the use of time signatures that were unusual in jazz music.

The whole second side of the album, the composition "Elementals", resulted from a relationship with Rayburn Wright, The Eastman School of Music and its "Arranger's Workshop" and an impending concert in Rochester, New York. It was Mr. Brubeck's first orchestral composition.

Overview
"Time Changes" is a continuation of Brubeck's hit albums Time Out, Time Further Out and Countdown—Time in Outer Space, exploring the elements of time in jazz and music, while extending itself into a "do-it-yourself" concerto, which comprises the whole of side two, with orchestral accompaniment. The cover painting is by the internationally acclaimed American abstract painter Sam Francis.

Track listing
On the original vinyl LP:

Side A
"Iberia"  - 3:00
"Unisphere"  - 5:43
"Shim Wha"  - 4:03
"World's Fair"  - 2:45
"Cable Car"  - 3:00
'Theme From Elementals' - 3:09 (CD only)

Side B
"Elementals"  - 16:35

Personnel
All pieces composed by Dave Brubeck, except "Shim Wha" by Joe Morello. The album was recorded over various sessions that took place in November 1963.

 Musical

 Dave Brubeck — piano
 Paul Desmond — alto saxophone
 Eugene Wright — bass
 Joe Morello — drums
 Rayburn Wright — orchestra conductor
 Fred Plaut, Robert Waller — recording engineers

External links and sources
https://web.archive.org/web/20121216140255/http://www.davebrubeck.com/live/ davebrubeck.com
http://www.jazzdisco.org/dave-brubeck/catalog/album-index/ Brubeck discography

References

1964 albums
Albums produced by Teo Macero
Albums recorded at CBS 30th Street Studio
Columbia Records albums
Concept albums
Dave Brubeck albums